Soulfood is the fifth studio album by the American soul and gospel singer Shirley Murdock. The album was released on March 20, 2007 and included the charting single "I Love Me Better Than That". The album peaked at #7 on Billboard's Top Gospel Albums chart on April 7, 2007.

Track listing

Personnel
Adapted from AllMusic

Shirley Murdock – lead vocals, executive producer
Paula Ewell – guest vocals
Bigg Robb – guest vocals, audio production
Bart "Sure 2 B" Thomas – guest vocals, audio production
Dale Degroat – guest vocals
The Solid Rock Choir – backing vocals, choir
Solid Rock Church Fire Choir – backing vocals, choir
Solid Rock Fire Choir – backing vocals, choir
Dale Anthony Grant – backing vocals, choir
Jana Mitten – backing vocals, choir, drums
Cheryl Dover – backing vocals, choir
Riccardo Bray – guitar
Marcus Dawson – keyboards
Kevin Graves – percussions
Keith Leak – keyboards
Lester Troutman – drum programming, drums
Dale Anthony DeGroat – audio production
Bryant Scott – executive producer
Tony Williams – engineer
Chip Allen – engineer
Reggie Anderson – photography

References

2011 albums
Shirley Murdock albums